Gil Cohen may refer to:

Gil Cohen (artist) (born 1931), American artist
Gil Cohen (footballer) (born 2000), Israeli footballer
Gil Cohen (sailor) (born 1992), Israeli Olympic sports sailor

See also
 Gili Cohen (born 1991), Israeli Olympic judoka